David Dean Thompson (born February 18, 1963) is a United States Space Force general who has served as the first vice chief of space operations since 2020. He previously served as the vice commander of the Space Force from 2018 to 2020.

Thompson entered the United States Air Force in 1985 after graduating from the United States Air Force Academy. He studied at Johannes Kepler University Linz as an Olmsted Scholar. A career space operations officer, he has commanded the 2nd Space Launch Squadron, 45th Operations Group, and Aerospace Data Facility-Colorado.

Early life and education 
Born and raised in Ambridge, Pennsylvania, David Dean Thompson was born on February 18, 1963. He graduated in Ambridge Area High School in 1981. He got his Bachelor of Science, majoring in astronautical engineering, from the United States Air Force Academy in Colorado Springs, Colorado and graduated in 1985. In 1989, he received his graduate degree of Master of Science in aeronautics and astronautics from Purdue University in West Lafayette, Indiana. He is also an Olmsted Scholar, graduate of the Senior Acquisition Course and a Level III-Certified Program Manager.

Military career 

Thompson received his commission as a second lieutenant in the United States Air Force from the United States Air Force Academy in 1985. He is a career space officer with assignments in operations, research and development, acquisition, and academia. He has commanded operational space units at the squadron, group, and wing levels.

A month after his commissioning, he was assigned in July 1985 to the Air Force Rocket Propulsion Laboratory at Edwards Air Force Base, California. For three years after getting his graduate degree, he was an instructor on astronautics in the U.S. Air Force Academy, assigned as the executive officer of the Department of Astronautics of the academy. From 1995 to 1998, he served at Space and Missile Systems Center as a program manager.

From July 2015 to July 2017, he served as the Air Force Space Command's then-two-star vice commander. That position was then renamed as AFSPC deputy commander in 2017 with Thompson serving as the special assistant to the AFSPC commander. In 2018, the AFSPC planned to revive the vice commander position, turning it into a position for a three-star general after Congress nixed plans on creating a deputy chief of staff for space operations position. On April 4, 2018, he then resumed his previous position as AFSPC vice commander, promoted to lieutenant general.

With the redesignation of the AFSPC as the newly created United States Space Force on December 20, 2019, Thompson retained his position as vice commander of the Space Force. In August 2020, he was nominated for transfer to the Space Force at his current rank of lieutenant general. He was also nominated for appointment to the rank of general and assignment as the first vice chief of space operations. He was confirmed by the Senate on September 30, 2020, and assumed rank following day. Thompson assumed office on October 2.

In October 2020, Thompson tested positive for COVID-19 after a family member who he was in contact with tested positive. He was asymptomatic and returned to work on November 9, 2020, after an 11-day quarantine.

Awards and decorations

Thompson is the recipient of the following awards and decorations:

Dates of promotion

Writings

References

External links

United States Air Force generals
United States Space Force generals
Living people
1960s births
Office of the Chief of Space Operations personnel
United States Air Force Academy alumni
Purdue University School of Aeronautics and Astronautics alumni